The Old First Reformed Church in Brooklyn, New York– officially known as The Reformed Dutch Church of the Town of Breukelen – is a historic Dutch Reformed church at 126 7th Avenue on the corner of Carroll Street in the Park Slope neighborhood of Brooklyn, New York, New York. The congregation was founded in 1654 by decree of Governor Pieter Stuyvesant, as one of three "collegiate churches." The current church building was constructed in 1888–1893 and is a Late Gothic Revival style Indiana limestone building on a granite base. It measures 100 feet wide and 162 feet deep.  The front facade features a 212-foot-high stone tower and spire.

The church was listed on the National Register of Historic Places in 1998.

References
Notes

External links

Old First Reformed Church website
History of the First Reformed Protestant Dutch church of Breuckelen: now known as the First Reformed church of Brooklyn, 1654 to 1896 (Google eBook) (1896)

Churches in Brooklyn
Dutch-American culture in New York City
Former Dutch Reformed churches in New York (state)
Properties of religious function on the National Register of Historic Places in Brooklyn
Gothic Revival church buildings in New York City
Churches completed in 1891